Rhynchobatus mononoke, the Japanese wedgefish, is a species of fish in the family Rhinidae. 
It is found in southern Japan.

References

mononoke
Fish of Japan
Taxa named by Keita Koeda
Taxa named by Masahide Itou
Taxa named by Morihiko Yamada
Taxa named by Hiroyuki Motomura
Fish described in 2020
Taxonomy articles created by Polbot